The fifth season of Smallville, an American television series, began airing on September 29, 2005. The series recounts the early adventures of Kryptonian Clark Kent as he adjusts to life in the fictional town of Smallville, Kansas, during the years before he becomes Superman. The fifth season comprises 22 episodes and concluded its initial airing on May 11, 2006, marking the final season that aired on The WB. Regular cast members during season five include Tom Welling, Kristin Kreuk, Michael Rosenbaum, Erica Durance, Allison Mack, John Glover, Annette O'Toole and John Schneider.

Season 5 deals with the aftermath of the second meteor shower. Clark deals with adult life, going to college, a real relationship with Lana, and the loss of someone he loves. His distrust for Lex continues to grow, as Clark's professor begins supplying him with evidence of LuthorCorp's secret projects. Clark looks to Chloe for support, while Lionel's transformation into a better person draws skepticism from everyone. Jensen Ackles, who played Jason Teague, left the show after season four, and Erica Durance became a series regular as Lois Lane. The writers also brought in Arthur Curry, Victor Stone, and Andrea Rojas, DC Comics superheroes, in three separate guest spots as well as the classic Superman villain Brainiac.

After spending seasons three and four airing on Wednesday at 8:00 pm (ET), Smallville was moved to Thursday at 8:00 pm, where it stayed for four seasons. Season five rose from the previous season, averaging 4.7 million viewers weekly. This was the last season to air on the WB Network. Season 6 and all following seasons aired on The CW Network following a merger of the WB and UPN networks.

Episodes

Tie-in
Since the second season, a promotional tie-in titled Chloe's Chronicles was established to wrap up "unfinished business" from the television series through the use of internet episodes. During season five, the series was evolved into Vengeance Chronicles. In this series, Chloe joins forces with a costumed vigilante she dubs the "Angel of Vengeance", who was introduced in the episode "Vengeance", to expose Lex Luthor's Level 33.1 experiments on meteor-infected people.

Awards
In 2006, the show was awarded an Emmy for Outstanding Editing for a Series for the fifth-season episode "Arrival". Allison Mack was awarded Best Sidekick in 2006. Guest star Emily Hirst was nominated for a Young Artist Award for her portrayal of Maddie Van Horn in "Fragile". In 2006, the show was nominated for a Golden Reel Award for Best Sound Editing in "Commencement". For the 32nd Annual Saturn Awards, the show received seven nominations: Best Network Television Series; Best Actor and Actress for Tom Welling and Kristin Kreuk; Best Supporting Actor and Actress for Michael Rosenbaum, Erica Durance and Allison Mack; and Best Television Release on DVD.

Home media release 
The complete fifth season of Smallville was released on September 12, 2006 in North America. Additional releases in region 2 and region 4 took place on August 28, 2006 and April 4, 2007, respectively. The DVD box set included various special features, including episode commentary, The Chloe Chronicles: Volume II, a behind-the-scenes featurette on the making of the 100th episode, Vengeance Chronicles webisodes, and a preview of the documentary Look, Up in the Sky! The Amazing Story of Superman.

References

External links

 
 
 List of Smallville season 5 episodes at Wikia
 
 List of Smallville season 5 guide at kryptonsite.com

5
2005 American television seasons
2006 American television seasons